Gordon Keith Brown (August 31, 1960 – May 2, 2018) was a Canadian politician who represented the Ontario riding of Leeds—Grenville—Thousand Islands and Rideau Lakes in the House of Commons of Canada as a member of the Conservative Party from 2004 until his death.

Background
Born in Toronto, Brown graduated from Gananoque Secondary School and had a degree in political science from Carleton University (1983), and an interest in a family-run business in Gananoque, Ontario.

Brown graduated from Gananoque Secondary School and Carleton University – B.A. (Hons) – Political Science.

Active in sports, Brown was a Canadian Kayaking Champion with the Gananoque Canoe Club and competed internationally and also competed in the World Championship in 1988.  Later in life, he was known to play hockey in the winter and golf and kayaking in the summer.

Prior to entering federal politics, Brown was a Gananoque town councillor; President of the 1000 Islands-Gananoque Chamber of Commerce, and chair of the St. Lawrence Parks Commission (operators of Fort Henry, Upper Canada Village and other attractions).

He was an active member of federal and provincial conservative associations since his youth.

Political career
Brown introduced a number of Private Members' Bills in the House of Commons: In 2008, C-393, also known as the Knife Bill, passed Second Reading and was at committee when the House dissolved, also in 2008 he introduced Bill C-542, which would provide for Employment Insurance Benefits for working parents of critically ill children. The provisions of C-542 later became law as part of government Bill C-44 in 2012. Brown also introduced C-370 a bill to change the name of the St. Lawrence Islands National Park of Canada to Thousand Islands National Park of Canada which became law in 2013.

Brown was appointed by Prime Minister Justin Trudeau, on the advice of Conservative Party of Canada Leader Andrew Scheer, to sit on the National Security and Intelligence Committee of Parliamentarians on November 6, 2017, and served on the committee until his death. From 2013 until the 2015 election, Brown was chair of the Standing Committee on Canadian Heritage and the House of Commons Chair of the Canada-United States Inter-Parliamentary Group. He was a member of the Trilateral Commission. He also sat on several all-party caucuses focusing on rural, health, border and other issues and also participated in numerous parliamentary groups.

Brown was chosen in an earlier Parliament by then-Prime Minister Stephen Harper to Chair the Special Committee that reviewed the Anti-Terrorism Act. He also served as chair of the Ontario Conservative Caucus under Harper.

Personal life and death
Brown was married to Claudine and leaves behind two sons, one of whom was born from a previous marriage to Sherry Brown.

Brown died on May 2, 2018, aged 57, after having a heart attack at his office on Parliament Hill.

Electoral record

References

External links
 
 Official site (via archive.org)

1960 births
2018 deaths
Carleton University alumni
Conservative Party of Canada MPs
Members of the House of Commons of Canada from Ontario
Politicians from Toronto
Canadian hoteliers
Ontario municipal councillors
21st-century Canadian politicians